Justin Robert Cox (born August 22, 1981) is a former  American-born professional soccer player and entrepreneur living in the United States.

He was the president and chairman of Gate City FC (a soccer club) in 2013,  when that club fielded a team in the National Premier Soccer League.  Cox is also currently the majority partner in Caveman Capital Partners, a venture capital and holding company.

Early life 
Justin Cox was born and raised in Greensboro, North Carolina to Larry Cox and Barbara "Babs" Cox. Cox lived with his mother, who worked for Leon's Style Salons as a hair stylist and father whom owned a plumbing company (Cox Plumbing, Inc.)

In Greensboro, Cox began playing soccer at the age of 5 among other sports. As his talent for the sport grew, Cox began to attract much more outside attention in Greensboro's soccer circles, leading his families decisions to allow him to play 3 years up in age. This allowing him to play with better competition, coaches, and gain more exposure to game.

In 1998, Cox was part of the U.S. under-17 player pool. In 1998, Cox signed a Generation Adidas player contract, as a goalkeeper for Major League Soccer's Tampa Bay Mutiny, his first professional contract before graduating from high school. Before Cox could play his first game he was being sidelined the remainder of the year with a torn anterior cruciate ligament in his left knee, required surgery and was subsequently sidelined. Cox returned after recovering, but knee injuries continued to plague him, causing him to be cut from his contract.

Working summer jobs and after school with his father learning the family trade and good work ethics, Cox found time to enjoy the life lessons of the Boy Scouts of America and in 1999 received his Eagle Scout Award, the highest honor in scouting.

Business ventures 
In 2000 at the age of 19, Cox accepted a position as president for Cox Plumbing, Inc. which provided residential plumbing repair and installation services. Cox took the position with his father's business to keep the company and family afloat after health issues left his father unable to continue to run the business and provide for his family. Cox Plumbing became successful In 2003. Cox sold Cox Plumbing at what was considered a well below market rate to “reward the people that helped him rebuild the family business.”

In 2003, after selling the plumbing company, Cox founded Quality Air Services, a regional air duct cleaning service provider, within two years Cox had turned it into the leading indoor air quality company in the region.  Cox, along with his partner Don Shumaker, followed that up with the acquisition of a number of smaller demolition companies in the region. This allowed the company to become one of the leading full service environmental, demolition, and industrial services firms in the Southeast and becoming one of ENR Top Specialty Contractors. Cox sold QAS, Inc. in 2014 for an undisclosed amount to a national restoration firm.

Cox owns Caveman Holdings, Inc., a venture capital and business holding company.

Other ventures

Professional Sports 
In 2006, Cox became a minority team owner with the purchase of Centurion Sports Management and the Greensboro NIFL team. The team would be known as Greensboro Revolution in the National Indoor Football League (NIFL) that began play as a 2006 expansion team. They played their home games at the Greensboro Coliseum in Greensboro, North Carolina. The team would continue its success throughout the 2006 and 2007 seasons. On January 23, 2008, it was announced that the team had folded, mainly due to low attendance numbers and problems off the playing field.

In May 2013,  Cox founded  Gate City FC, a professional soccer club which fielded teams in the National Premier Soccer League (NPSL) and United States Adult Soccer Association (USASA). The club was officially accepted into the National Premier Soccer League on Monday, November 4, 2013. The team played its home games at the Armfield Athletic Center, Guilford College in Greensboro, North Carolina the fourth tier of the American Soccer Pyramid, in the Mid-Atlantic Conference in 2014. Fans and current players chose the Gate City name, making Gate City FC the third Greensboro soccer club.

Civic leader 
In addition to his successes in business and sports, Cox also focuses much attention on civic activities. Cox has served on the Board of Directors for the Gate City Community Foundation for the past 3 years. He also serves on the Advisory Board for Entrepreneurship the University of North Carolina at Greensboro. Cox has served as a volunteer soccer coach with Greensboro United Soccer Association. At 25 Cox was a recipient of the Triad Business Journal "40 Leaders Under 40" award.  Additionally Cox and most recently by Governor Pat McCrory (R) to vice chair of the environmental committee of the Transportation Authority of North Carolina which oversees the transportation process throughout the state.

Philanthropist 
Cox is also well known for his many philanthropic contributions and has received several honors and awards for his work. Cox currently serves on the Board of Directors for the Gate City Community Foundation

Political affiliation 
Cox is a member of the Republican Party. He supports local Republicans, and has supported GOP presidential nominees since the late 1990s. Cox was also appointed by Governor Pat McCrory as a member of the North Carolina Environmental Management Commission.

Personal life 
Cox has one child, and is currently living in Reidsville, North Carolina

References 

1981 births
Living people